Pittsford Sutherland High School is a public high school in suburban Rochester, Monroe County in upstate New York. In 2021, the school was ranked in the top 2 percent (#319 nationwide; #36 in New York) in U.S. News & World Reports annual evaluation of nearly 18,000 public high schools.

Notable alumni

 Marty Byrnes, basketball player, first round pick in 1978 NBA draft
 John Curran, director of The Painted Veil
 John F. Harris, journalist; founder, Politico; author, The Survivor: Bill Clinton in the White House, Random House, May 2005.
 Pete Pfitzinger, distance runner, author, 2 time Olympian
 Chyna (Joan Marie Laurer), American professional wrestler, glamour model, author, and bodybuilder
 Adam Podlesh, aka the hammer, NFL punter
 Morgan Schild, American freestyle mogul skier, 2018 olympian
 Leehom Wang, C-pop singer, producer, actor, musician

Feeder patterns
Allen Creek, Jefferson Road, and the northern part of Mendon Center Elementary Schools feed into Calkins Road Middle School, then to Pittsford Sutherland High School.

References

External links
 

High schools in Monroe County, New York
Educational institutions established in 1957
Public high schools in New York (state)
1957 establishments in New York (state)